The rail war (Rel'sovaya Voyna; , Rejkavaja Vajna; , Reykova Viyna) was the name for the actions of Soviet partisans in the Soviet Union, especially in German-occupied Byelorussia and Ukraine. The operations were carried out with the intention of disrupting German logistics via the destruction of rail lines, thus preventing the travel of equipment and manpower to the front.

Overview 
In June 1943, the Central Committee of the Communist Party of Byelorussia adopted a resolution calling for the destruction of German rail lines, as well as a general strike of rail workers in order to prevent their reconstruction. It was also to be accompanied by intentional train wrecks and destruction of bridges and stations.

Partisans during the Second World War frequently used tactics recommended by the CPB, but were most frequently used during Operations Rail War, Concert and Bagration. In fact, Ilya Starinov, one of the primary saboteurs, helped organise the latter two operations. Explosives were heavily used during the rail war to destroy German rail lines. Many partisans used explosives which had been developed for the express purpose of the rail war, but others used grenades or improvised explosive devices.

Data on the rail war differs between German and Soviet sources, but it is commonly agreed that the partisans caused large disruptions of German logistics. Between 1944 and 1945, medals dedicated to participation in the rail war were awarded in Minsk.

See also 
 2022 rail war in Belarus
 2022 rail war in Russia

References 

Rail transport in the Soviet Union
Military history of the Soviet Union during World War II
Battles and operations of the Eastern Front of World War II